The Bonsall DB-1 Mustang is a single place, semi-scale P-51 Mustang replica homebuilt aircraft.

Design and development
The Bonsall DB-1 Mustang was built over a 16-year period in England by designer Dave Bonsall. The finished aircraft used a Lycoming O-360 engine sourced from a Socata TB-10 Tobago. The aircraft is a single seat, low wing aircraft with retractable conventional landing gear.

Specifications (DB-1 Mustang)

See also

References

External links

Image of the DB-1

Homebuilt aircraft
Single-engined tractor aircraft
Low-wing aircraft
Aircraft manufactured in the United Kingdom
North American P-51 Mustang replicas
Aircraft first flown in 1991